Georg Michael Wittmann (22 (23?) January 1760, near Pleistein, Oberpfalz, Bavaria – 8 March 1833, at Ratisbon) was a German prelate of the Catholic Church.

Life

He studied first with the Jesuits, then with the Benedictines at Amberg (1769–78), and at the University of Heidelberg (1778-9). On 21 December 1782, he was ordained priest and after doing parish work at Kenmath, Kaltenbrunn, and Miesbrunn he became professor and subregens at the diocesan seminary of Ratisbon in 1788 and regens in 1802. From 1804 he was also pastor of the cathedral.

In 1829 he was appointed auxiliary Bishop of Ratisbon and consecrated titular Bishop of Comana. In 1830, when the coadjutor Johann Michael Sailer  became ordinary of Ratisbon, Wittmann was made his vicar-general; and after Sailer's death he was nominated Bishop of Ratisbon, 1 July 1832, but died before his preconization.

He exerted an influence on the candidates (numbering over fifteen hundred) whom he prepared for the priesthood during the forty-five years of his connection with the seminary. By his zeal, charity, and exemplary life, he gained the affection and esteem of all. He was buried in the cathedral of Ratisbon, where a monument was erected to his memory by Conrad Eberhard.

Works

His chief literary works are:

"Principia catholica de sacra Scriptura" (Ratisbon, 1793)
"Annotationes in Pentateuchum Moysis" (Ibid., 1796)
"De horarum canonicarum utilitate morali" (Augsburg, 1801)
"Anmahnung zum Colibate" (s. l., 1804; Ratisbon, 1834)
"Confessarius pro aetate juvenili" (Sulzbach, 1832).

Wittmann also prepared with Feneberg a translation of the New Testament (Nuremberg, 1808; latest edition, Sulzbach, 1878). For a time he availed himself of the services of the Protestant Bible Society of London to spread his translation among the people, but in 1820 he severed all relations with this society.

References

Mittermuller, Leben und Wirken des frommen Bisch., Michel Wittmann (Landshut, 1859)
Mehler, Lebensbeschreibung des frommen Bisch. Michael Wittmann (Ratisbon, 1894)
Hahn, Bisch. Michael Wittmnn, das Bild eines frommen und segensreichen Lebens (Ratisbon, 1860)

External links
Source

1760 births
1833 deaths
Roman Catholic bishops of Regensburg
19th-century Roman Catholic bishops in Bavaria
Burials at Regensburg Cathedral